The St. Martin of Tours Cathedral also called Mukacheve Cathedral is the name given to a religious building affiliated with the Catholic Church which is located in the city of Mukacheve in the west part of European country of Ukraine.

The church is decorated with a light brown tone. Its main and highest tower is adorned with a clock, and the entrance gate was decorated with a vaulted arch and columns. It has an adjoining chapel dedicated to St. Joseph is located near the cathedral dates back to the fourteenth century. The church was built between 1904 and 1905 in an eclectic style. In Soviet times, it was closed by the authorities of the local communist party. In 1990 it was returned to the Catholic faithful. Since 2002, it is the cathedral of the new Diocese of Mukachevo of the Latins (Dioecesis Munkacsiensis Latinorum; Єпархія Мукачево) that was created by bull Cum Transcarpatiae of Pope John Paul II.

See also
List of cathedrals in Ukraine
Roman Catholicism in Ukraine
St. Martin of Tours

References

Roman Catholic cathedrals in Ukraine
Buildings and structures in Mukacheve
Roman Catholic churches completed in 1905
1905 establishments in Austria-Hungary
20th-century Roman Catholic church buildings in Ukraine